Sečujac is a Serbian surname meaning "someone from Sečuj. It may refer to:

Arsenije Sečujac (1720–1814), Habsburg Monarchy general
Đorđe Sečujac (fl. 1751), Habsburg Monarchy captain

Serbian surnames